14 Vileyrey (English: fourteenth night) is a 2011 Maldivian romantic horror film directed by Abdul Faththaah. Produced by Hassan under Dash Studio, the film stars Ali Seezan, Mariyam Nisha and Aishath Rishmy in pivotal roles. The film was released on 27 June 2011. Upon release, the film received mixed response from critics, did good business at box office and was ultimately declared a "Hit".

Cast 
 Ali Seezan
 Mariyam Nisha
 Aishath Rishmy as Nazima
 Fauziyya Hassan
 Arifa Ibrahim
 Roanu Hassan Manik

Development
Abdul Faththaah assigned Ibrahim Waheed to write the story and script for the film in 2010. Initially Fatthah, wanted the story to involve a ghost and a spirit, though Waheed and Fatthah later came to a conclusion to omit the involvement of ghost in script since "its a challenge to incorporate both ghost and spirit simultaneously". The project faced controversy when the team of Kuhveriakee Kaakuhey? accuses Fatthah for "purloining their plot" which also features Aishath Rishmy.

Soundtrack

Accolades

References

2011 films
Maldivian horror films
2011 horror films
Romantic horror films
Films directed by Abdul Faththaah